Bouchard Père et Fils is a French wine grower, négociant and producer based in Beaune, in the Côte de Beaune wine-growing region of Burgundy, France.

The firm was established as a cloth merchant by Michel Bouchard in 1731, and in 1746 his son Joseph subsequently began selling wines and acquiring vineyards. The name Bouchard Père et Fils was officially adopted in 1785 with Antoine-Philibert-Joseph, son of Joseph. In 1995 the Bouchard family sold the firm to Joseph Henriot.

References

External links
 Bouchard Family History and Genealogy
 Bouchard Père et Fils official site

Burgundy (historical region) wine producers
1731 establishments in France
French companies established in 1731
Food and drink companies established in 1731